Tranwell is a small village and former civil parish, now in the parish of Mitford, in the county of Northumberland, England, about  south west of Morpeth. It lies alongside the A1 road which now bypasses Morpeth. Tranwell is approximately 15 miles from the Newcastle International Airport and over 3 miles away from Morpeth train station. The closest major city to Tranwell is Newcastle upon Tyne. In 1951 the parish had a population of 154.

Governance 
Tranwell is in the parliamentary constituency of Berwick-upon-Tweed and is represented in the UK Parliament by Anne Marie-Trevelyan. The parish was formed on 30 September 1894 from part of Tranwell and High Church, on 1 April 1955 the parish was abolished and merged with Mitford.

See also 
Tranwell Airfield

References

Villages in Northumberland
Former civil parishes in Northumberland